Catocala kotschubeyi is a moth in the family Erebidae first described by Leo Sheljuzhko in 1927. It is found in the Russian Far East (southern Ussuri).

References

kotschubeyi
Moths described in 1927
Moths of Asia